Ærø Municipality is a municipality (Danish, kommune) occupying the 88 km² island of Ærø in Denmark in the  Region of Southern Denmark as of 1 January 2007, and in 2006 in Funen County. The municipality also encompasses Birkholm and the uninhabited islands Lilleø, Dejrø and Halmø.

The first mayor of Ærø (2006-09;2014-17) was Jørgen Otto Jørgensen (born 21 December 1950, Marstal) a member of the Social Democrats (Socialdemokraterne) political party, until 2005 mayor of Ærøskøbing Municipality. As of 1 January 2022 the mayor is Peter Hansted (born 12 January 1956, Lyngby) representing the Social Democrats. The most populous town is Marstal and the seat of the municipal council is Ærøskøbing.

The municipality was created 1 January 2006 as a result of the municipal reform of 2007 (approved by the lawmakers of the Folketing 16 June 2005 with elections for the new municipal and regional board members in the 98 municipalities and 5 regions taking place 15 November 2005, once every 4 years), through a merger of Marstal and Ærøskøbing municipalities. However, the new municipality nonetheless agreed to enter into a "municipal cooperation agreement" with Svendborg Municipality.

The Danish municipal reform was implemented Monday 1 January 2007, but politicians on Ærø were given the go-ahead to unify the island one year ahead of the rest of the municipalities that were merged as a result of the reform. From 1 January 2006 until 31 December 2006 Ærø Municipality belonged to Funen County.

The result is a municipality with an area of 91 km² and a population today of 6008 (1. January 2023). In January 1985 8429 people lived on the area of the present municipality, and in January 2006 6873 people. The new municipality belonged to Funen County in 2006 and is part of the new Region of Southern Denmark from 1 January 2007.

Locations

Politics
Ærø's municipal council consists of 15 members, elected every four years.

Municipal council
Below are the municipal councils elected since the Municipal Reform of 2007.

References

External links

Official website

Municipalities of the Region of Southern Denmark
Municipalities of Denmark
Populated places established in 2006
Ærø